Lubomír Vambera (3 March 1925 – 31 January 2007) was a Czechoslovak sprint canoeist who competed in the late 1940s and early 1950s. Competing in two Summer Olympics, he earned his best finish of sixth in the K-1 1000 m event at Helsinki in 1952.

References
Lubomír Vambera's profile at Sports Reference.com

1925 births
2007 deaths
Canoeists at the 1948 Summer Olympics
Canoeists at the 1952 Summer Olympics
Czechoslovak male canoeists
Olympic canoeists of Czechoslovakia